Mark Robert Visser (born 9 March 1983) is an Australian professional big wave surfer, author, keynote speaker and ocean adventurer.   Visser is best known for being the first person to surf Hawaii's most dangerous wave Jaws, Maui, at night in 2011. It was documented in a film called 'Night Rider'.

Training
Visser coaches professional athletes from big wave inspired surf programs for water and land. These programs included training to overcome fear, deal with stressful situations in and out of the water, and submersion without oxygen. In addition to submersion without taking a breath, Visser can also hold his breath underwater for 6 minutes and 4 seconds.

Career

Visser spent three years competing on the World Qualifying Series (WQS) ASP world tour before focusing on big wave surf 
events. Visser's past achievements include: 5th in the 2006/2007 APT tow-in tour event in Chile, 7th in the Nelscott Reef Big Wave Paddle in event United States, and runner up in the 2008/2009, 2009/2010, 2010/2011 and 2014/2015 Oakley ASL Big Wave Awards. His accomplishments were also recognized by the XXL awards for biggest wave ridden. Visser won the 2014/15 Big Wave Paddle-in ASL Big Wave Awards. In 2015-2016 Visser was selected as one of the eight world professional water athletes, to compete in the Ultimate Waterman contest.  Visser ranked in the top 3 for the Short Board, Long Board, Big Wave/ Tube ridding event, 6 km Prone Paddle race, 18 km Waka Ama / OC1 race and the Underwater Strength Run and Swim event. In addition to his sports activities, Visser also gives keynote speeches to individuals, corporations, teams and organizations including TEDx Noosa. His goal is to inspire others by sharing his story.

Tasmania event 
In July 2011, Visser, along with his brother Kevin and a group of local surfers James Hick, Marty Paradisis and Mike Brennan conquered waves as high as four meters during severe hailstorms. This particularly dangerous surfing trip prompted the surfers to paddle in, rather than tow.

Works

Operation Night Rider

On 20 January, Visser became the first person to surf Jaws break in Maui at night. During this event known as the 'Night Rider', he rode 30–40-foot waves in dangerous outer reef, illuminated by engineered LED lights built into his buoyancy vest and integrated into his surfboard. This night ride is the start for an upcoming adventure documentary called 'Nine Lives' which Visser is currently working on.  'Operation Night Rider' with cooperation of cameraman Drew Llewellyn won an 'Australian Cinematography Award' in the category of 'Documentaries, Cinema & TV'.

Operation Deep Blue
Visser's second project documents him and his team as they parachute out of a specialized aircraft with their jet skis and surfboard in search of 'freak' waves.

Documentary
Visser is currently working on an adventure documentary which involves new technology and display of human strength and endurance.

Others 
 Diaries with Mark Visser are very short segments that follow Visser around the world in search of some of the best big wave locations. The Diaries run on Fuel TV.
 "Ocean Warrior Course" is a training program created by Visser to help surfers discover the secrets of the elite underwater athletes. The course originates from Visser's own past struggling in big waves. The course teaches about breath holding and safety in the water to students including Navy SEAL and big wave surfers. Over the past 5 years, he has coached some of the most elite military organizations, Olympic and professional sporting teams in the world.
 Book:  "The Big Wave Method -Eight Steps to Overcoming Your Fear and Achieving Your Ultimate Dream".  Mark Visser. 31 October 2017. Hay House. .

Recognition 
Visser is known as the 2014/15 Big Wave Paddle-in Champion and three times runner up for the ASL Big Wave Awards. He spends his time tracking down some of the biggest waves on the planet utilising innovative technology and pioneers unique ways to surf them. Visser feats are not only about surfing, but adventure, exploration and survival.

References

External links 
Official Website
FuelTV Interview at Tracks Magazine
Coverage of JAWS Night ride at surfd
Wave Warrior (pbs.org)

Big wave surfing
1983 births
Living people
Australian surfers